Deh-e Yari (also Romanized as Deh-e Yarī) is a village in Mosaferabad Rural District, Rudkhaneh District, Rudan County, Hormozgan Province, Iran. At the 2006 census, its population was 126, in 27 families.

References 

Populated places in Rudan County